Alice Franco (born 10 February 1989) is an Italian swimmer bronze medal at senior level at the 2011 World Aquatics Championships.

She also was twice European champion, in 2011 and 2012.

References

External links
 

1989 births
Living people
Swimmers of Gruppo Sportivo Esercito
Italian female long-distance swimmers
World Aquatics Championships medalists in open water swimming
Medalists at the 2011 Summer Universiade
Universiade medalists in swimming
Universiade bronze medalists for Italy
21st-century Italian women